Pterostylis sargentii commonly known as the frog greenhood, is a plant in the orchid family Orchidaceae and is endemic to the south-west of Western Australia. It is a relatively common orchid which has up to six relatively small, white flowers with green or brown stripes and a fleshy, three-part, frog-like labellum. Non-flowering plants have a rosette of leaves on a short stalk.

Description
Pterostylis sargentii, is a terrestrial,  perennial, deciduous, herb with an underground tuber. Flowering occurs from July to October.

Taxonomy and naming
Pterostylis sargentii was first formally described in 1905 by the British educator, Cecil Rollo Payton Andrews and the description was published in Journal of the West Australian Natural History Society. The specific epithet (sargentii) honours the Western Australian pharmacist Oswald Sargent who collected the type specimen.

Distribution and habitat
The frog greenhood is found in a wide range of habitats throughout the south-west of Western Australia, but especially between Mullewa and Grass Patch.

Conservation
Pterostylis sargentii is classified as "not threatened" by the Western Australian Government Department of Parks and Wildlife.

References

External links
 Cecil Rollo Payton Andrews

sargentii
Endemic orchids of Australia
Orchids of Western Australia
Plants described in 1905
Taxa named by Cecil Rollo Payton Andrews